Robert C. Cooper is a Canadian writer and producer best known for his work in the Stargate franchise. He was formerly an executive producer of Stargate SG-1, Stargate Atlantis and Stargate Universe. He also co-created both Stargate Atlantis and Stargate Universe with Brad Wright. Cooper has written and produced many episodes of Stargate SG-1, Stargate Atlantis and Stargate Universe as well as directed a number of episodes.

Career
Cooper started his writing career with a series of films, the first of which was Blown Away. He joined the crew of Psi Factor: Chronicles of the Paranormal as a story editor until he was promoted to a writer in 1996 where he worked until moving to Stargate SG-1 in 1997 as an executive story editor.

Whilst working on Stargate SG-1, Cooper is credited with writing 52 episodes. Cooper became a co-executive producer of Stargate SG-1 in season 4, and a full executive producer in season 5. He made a cameo appearance in the Stargate SG-1 fifth season episode "Wormhole X-Treme!", in which he was a staff writer who was told to get back to work.

Cooper was responsible for creating much of the backstory of the Stargate universe. According to Stargate SG-1: The Essential Scripts, Cooper's ideas about the history of the Stargate universe were his own; he wasn't working from ideas in a series bible. Cooper created the Ancients, the race that built the stargates. He also developed the idea of the Alliance of Four Races, even though two of the races had been invented by other writers (the Nox and the Asgard created by Hart Hanson and Katharyn Powers respectively).

In December 2003, it was announced that Cooper and Brad Wright had been working on a Stargate SG-1 spin-off series titled Stargate Atlantis.

Cooper made his directorial debut with "Crusade" a ninth season episode of Stargate SG-1. In the 10th season premiere episode "Flesh and Blood", Cooper's daughter Emma played the 4 year old Adria. Later in the tenth season of Stargate SG-1, in early scenes of the episode "Talion", his older daughter Megan Elizabeth Cooper played a jaffa girl. Cooper also directed "Unending" the final episode of Stargate SG-1. Following the conclusion of SG-1, Cooper wrote and directed the direct-to-DVD movie Stargate: The Ark of Truth.

After Stargate Atlantis was cancelled, Cooper and Brad Wright went on to create another spin-off, Stargate Universe which premiered on October 2, 2009. In June 2010, it was revealed that Cooper was "stepping back to ... a consulting role" for the end of Stargate Universe season 2, before leaving entirely.

Filmography

Film

Television 
The numbers in directing and writing credits refer to the number of episodes.

Awards
Out of fifteen nominations, Cooper has received four awards.

 2009 – Leo Awards, Best Direction in a Dramatic Series: Stargate Atlantis: "Vegas"
 2009 – Leo Awards, Best Dramatic Series: Stargate Atlantis (Shared)
 2009 – Leo Awards, Outstanding Achievement Award – Individual (Shared with Brad Wright)
 2006 – The Constellation Awards, Best Overall 2006 Science Fiction Film or Television Script: Stargate SG-1: "200" (Shared with Brad Wright)

References

External links

 

21st-century Canadian screenwriters
21st-century Canadian male writers
Canadian male screenwriters
Living people
1968 births